= Rhodesiomylacris =

Rhodesiomylacris Temporal range: Lopingian

Scientific classification
- Domain: Eukaryota
- Kingdom: Animalia
- Phylum: Arthropoda
- Class: Insecta
- Order: Blattodea
- Family: †Mylacrididae
- Genus: †Rhodesiomylacris; Zeuner, 1955

Type species
- Rhodesiomylacris bondi

Extinct genus of insects

Rhodesiomylacris is an extinct genus of mylacridid insect known from fossils from the Lopingian of Zimbabwe. It is a monotypic genus known from a single species, R. bondi.

This genus was originally assigned to the family "Mylacrididae", an alternative spelling of "Mylacridae".
